Marshall Islands competed at the 2022 World Aquatics Championships in Budapest, Hungary from 18 June to 3 July.

Swimming

Swimmers from the Marshall Islands have achieved qualifying standards in the following events.

References

Nations at the 2022 World Aquatics Championships
2022 in Marshallese sports
Marshall Islands at the World Aquatics Championships